Lu Jie may refer to:

Ed Lu (born 1963), or Lu Jie, Chinese American physicist 
Lü Jie (born 1984), Chinese model and actress